SPF/PC is an MS-DOS-based text editor and file manager designed to have an interface that was familiar to those using mainframe SPF and ISPF.

Later Microsoft Windows-based versions were named SPF/SE and SPF/SE 365. A version for OS/2 named SPF/2 was also offered. SPF/SE and SPF/SE 365 were released as freeware in 2022 after the death of Tim Tetiva, the author of SPF/PC and SPF/SE.

Overview
SPF/PC was introduced by and successors sold by Command Technology Corporation. Similar to IBM's mainframe based ISPF and is able to edit ASCII and EBCDIC text file as a complete integrated applications development environment (IDE). Typically used for editing source code, invoking compilers, linkers, and debuggers, in a variety of programming languages, such as COBOL, Fortran, and C++.

64-bit Windows can't run SPF/PC (Will run under DOSBox), but it can still be used on 32-bit Windows (e.g. Windows XP or Windows 7 in XP Mode).

Features

Macro/Scripting Language
SPF/SE 365 uses a C like macro/scripting language.

All versions of SPF have the ability to call any interpreter (PHP, BASIC, Powershell, etc.) from within the editor allowing text processing and OS command calls. SPF/SE does not have the REXX interface that SPF/PC had.

External links
SPF-Editor project on Github
Command Technology Corporation web-site (archived)
List of ISPF-style PC editors.

References

Windows text editors